The Oakland County Child Killer (OCCK) is the name given to the perpetrator(s) responsible for the serial killings of at least four children in Oakland County, Michigan, United States, between 1976 and 1977. The victims were held captive before being killed, and forensic DNA testing has indirectly implicated two suspects, one of whom has since died, with the other serving life in prison for offenses against children. A DNA profile created from samples taken from some of the victims' bodies is from the main perpetrator, but does not match the DNA of anyone named in connection with the case; the perpetrator's identity is unknown.

Background 
Between February 15, 1976, and March 16, 1977, two boys and two girls aged between 10 and 12 went missing outside their homes, en route to or from another location, in Oakland County, Michigan, north of Detroit. Each child's body was discovered in a public area within nineteen days of his or her disappearance. The children were all either strangled or shot, with the two boys having been sexually abused. Once the victims were dead, the offender dispersed their bodies around Oakland County in places where they could be seen by roadways. The four deaths triggered a murder investigation which at the time was the largest in U.S. history, with Detroit's two daily newspapers, as well as the area's numerous radio and television stations, covering the case. A presentation on WXYT radio, entitled Winter's Fear: The Children, the Killer, the Search, won the Peabody Award in 1977.

Victims

Confirmed
 Mark Douglas Stebbins, 12, of Ferndale, did not return home from an American Legion Hall on February 15, 1976. His body was found four days later, wearing the same clothes he was last seen in, laying on a pile of wood and dirt in the parking lot of a local office building in Southfield. He had been strangled and sexually abused with a foreign object, and had two lacerations to the left rear of his head. Rope marks were evident on both his wrists and ankles, indicating he had been bound during his captivity.
 Jill Robinson, 12, of Royal Oak, left her home on December 22, 1976, following an argument with her mother over dinner preparations. The following day, her bicycle was found behind a local hobby store, before her body was found alongside Interstate 75 in Troy, within view of Troy police station, on the morning of December 26. She had been shot in the face with a 12-gauge shotgun, and her body was fully clothed and wearing the backpack she had taken with her when she left home.
 Kristine Marie Mihelich, 10, of Berkley, was reported missing on January 2, 1977, after she failed to return home from a 7-Eleven store on 12 Mile Road at Oakshire. A mail carrier found her fully clothed body nineteen days later on the side of a rural road in Franklin Village. She had been smothered to death less than twenty-four hours earlier and her body lay within view of nearby homes.
 Timothy John King, 11, left his home in Birmingham and went to a pharmacy on the evening of March 16, 1977. After he failed to return home, an intensive search covering the entire Detroit metropolitan area was conducted, before his body was found on the evening of March 22 by two teenagers in a shallow ditch alongside Gill Road in Livonia. He had been sexually assaulted with a foreign object and suffocated approximately six hours earlier.

Suspected
 17-year-old Donna Serra went missing after hitchhiking to a beach after school in Macomb County, Michigan on September 29, 1972. Serra's body was discovered face down in a shallow creek on October 20, 1972, in her hometown of Ray Township in Macomb County, close to the 27 Mile Road. Before she was killed, Serra had been imprisoned and drugged for several days. Her death was due to strangulation. Her murder remains unsolved.
 13-year-old Jane Louise “Janey” Allen went missing on August 8, 1976 and was last seen hitchhiking between Pontiac and Royal Oak in Oakland County, Michigan. Allen was found dead floating in a river in Miamisburg, Ohio, on August 11, 1976, four days later over 200 miles away from her Royal Oak home. Her wrists had been tied behind her back with torn strips of a T-shirt. Decomposition of the body left police unable to determine whether or not Allen had been sexually assaulted but they were able to ascertain that Allen had been dead before being dumped in the water. She had died from carbon monoxide poisoning.
 Kimberly Alice "Kim" King, 12, disappeared from Warren on September 15, 1979. She had stayed over at a friend's house that night. When she called her sister at 11:00 p.m., she claimed to have snuck out of her friend's house and to be phoning from a nearby outdoor phone booth. Her sister instructed her to return inside. However, Kimberly never went back to her friend's house and has not been seen or heard from since. Authorities believe she was abducted and that her disappearance is connected to the unsolved killings.

Disproved
 16-year-old Judy Ferro was found beaten and strangled on January 1, 1976, at Lola Valley Park in Redford, Michigan. When she vanished between midnight and 3 a.m. in the morning from her customer's family home, she had been babysitting the previous evening. A Redford Township policeman discovered Ferro's body at 7 a.m. in the morning, fully dressed. When it was learned that Gary Pervinkler, 19, had left his home the same evening with a gun and his father's automobile, he was identified as a prime suspect. On April 7, 1976, Pervinkler's body was discovered; he had shot himself in the head. The firearm found next to Ferro's body matched a bullet casing discovered in the house from where Ferro was abducted. Her case was closed.
 Cynthia Rae “Cindy” Cadieux, 16, of Roseville, was found bludgeoned to death on January 16, 1976, in Bloomfield Township.  Cynthia had been abducted whilst hitchhiking in the 11 Mile area of Roseville, between Gratiot and Grosbeck, on January 14, 1976. Her naked body was found shortly after and she had been tied up, raped and then beaten to death. In 1979, Robert Anglin and Raymond Heinrich were both convicted of her murder. A third individual, who has not been named, was also involved, but he passed away before their arrest. Both men were sentenced to life in prison.
 Sheila Srock, 14, was raped and shot dead while babysitting in Birmingham, Michigan on January 20, 1976. Her killer, Oliver Rhodes Andrews, had burglarized several homes in the neighborhood earlier that evening, and a neighbor was a witness while snow shoveling his roof. Andrews was sentenced to life imprisonment.

Possible
 Patricia Ann Spencer and Pamela Sue Hobley, both 16 and 15 respectively, were last seen in Oscoda, Michigan on October 31, 1969, the day of their high school's homecoming football game. A passing driver stopped to pick them up and drove them to a petrol station at River Road and Interstate 23. They were last seen strolling together on River Road away from the school and towards the business district. Both disappeared and have not been seen since. A link to the Oakland County Child Killer has been explored by investigators, though this was deemed unlikely.
 Laura Wilson, 16, went to a Bi-Rite Market in Detroit, Michigan, in the evening of November 10, 1972. She arrived at the market, but went missing shortly afterward. On November 10, 1972, youngsters in Wayne County discovered her dead body in bushes not far from her home. She had been assaulted and raped. Her head had also been smashed in with a brick. Evidence in her case was ordered destroyed by police in the late-1970s after authorities reinvestigated her case for links to the Oakland County Child Killer.
 On February 2, 1977, 10-year-old Valerie Bishop was attacked, raped, and stabbed, close to an empty house a short distance from the home she shared with her family on the west side of Detroit. She had gone to a corner store to get milk as part of an errand for her mother. At the time, the Oakland County Child Killer task force was active, but they chose not to look into or investigate Valerie's murder. 30-year-old Moses Potter was charged with her murder but was released due to a lack of evidence. No one else was ever arrested and her case remains unsolved.

Investigation
After the discovery of Mihelich's body, authorities noticed similarities shared by her case and those of Stebbins and Robinson, and reports were released warning the public that a serial killer was possibly operating in the Oakland County area. The Michigan State Police led a group of law-enforcement officials from thirteen communities in the formation of a task force, devoted solely to the investigation into the killings of the three children.

After King disappeared, a woman told authorities that she had seen a boy with a skateboard (like King) talking to a man in the parking lot of the pharmacy that he visited on March 16, 1977. A composite drawing of the suspected kidnapper and his blue AMC Gremlin was released, and authorities questioned every Gremlin owner in Oakland County. Investigators created a profile based on witnesses' descriptions of the man seen talking to King—a white male aged between 25 and 35 with a dark complexion, shaggy hair and sideburns, who had a job that gave him freedom of movement and made him appear trustworthy to children, was familiar with the area and could keep children captive for long periods of time without rousing neighbors' suspicions.

The task force checked more than 18,000 tips, which resulted in about two dozen arrests on unrelated charges and the discovery of a multi-state child pornography ring operating on North Fox Island in Lake Michigan. The task force was unable to make much headway in the investigation, disbanding in December 1978, with the investigation being turned over to the State Police.

Suspects and persons of interest
A few weeks after King's murder, a psychiatrist who worked with the task force received a letter, riddled with spelling errors, written by an anonymous author ("Allen") claiming to be a sadomasochist slave of the killer ("Frank"). "Allen" wrote that they had both served in the Vietnam War, that "Frank" was traumatized by having killed children, and that "Frank" had taken revenge on more affluent citizens, such as the residents of Birmingham, for sending forces to Vietnam. "Allen" expressed fear and remorse in his letter, saying he was losing his sanity and was endangered and suicidal, and admitted to having accompanied "Frank" as the latter sought boys to kill. He instructed the psychiatrist to respond by printing the code words "weather bureau says trees to bloom in three weeks" in that Sunday's edition of the Detroit Free Press, before offering to provide photographic evidence in exchange for immunity from prosecution. The psychiatrist arranged to meet "Allen" at a bar, but "Allen" did not show up and was never heard from again.

Archibald Edward Sloan, a child molester who victimized young boys in his neighborhood, became a person of interest after hair samples found in his 1966 Pontiac Bonneville matched hair found on the bodies of King and Stebbins, but the hair was not from Sloan himself. A witness claimed to have seen King being abducted by two men, one described as being in his late 20s and the other described as bearing a strong resemblance to serial killer John Wayne Gacy, who was allegedly in Michigan around the time of the killings. Gacy's DNA did not match DNA found on the victims' bodies.

Police in Parma Heights, Ohio arrested Ted Lamborgine, a retired auto worker believed to have been involved in a child pornography ring in the 1970s. On March 27, 2007, investigators told Detroit television station WXYZ that Lamborgine was considered the top suspect in this case. Lamborgine pleaded guilty to fifteen sex-related counts involving young boys rather than accept a plea bargain that would have required him to take a polygraph test on the Oakland County killings. He also rejected an offer of a reduced sentence in exchange for a polygraph on the case. In October 2007, the family of Mark Stebbins filed a wrongful death lawsuit against Lamborgine seeking $25,000. The lawsuit alleges Lamborgine, who lived in Metro Detroit in the late 1970s, abducted Stebbins and held him captive in a Royal Oak house for four days in February 1976 before smothering him to death during a sexual assault. Lamborgine has never been formally linked nor charged in the death of Stebbins. Attorney David A. Binkley has sought compensation, including funeral costs, for Stebbins' brother, Michael, but stressed that money is secondary.

The case sparked new interest when King's father, Barry, and brother, Chris, tried to get the State Police to release information about Chris Busch, the son of General Motors executive Harold Lee Busch. Chris Busch had been in police custody shortly before King's abduction for suspected involvement in child pornography. He allegedly committed suicide in November 1978. There was no gunshot residue found on him, though, and no blood spatter; the entry wound was between his eyes. Furthermore, there were four shell casings found in Busch's room. He was also found wrapped neatly under his sheets. Bloodstained ligatures were found in his apartment, as was a hand-drawn image of a boy closely resembling Stebbins screaming which was found pinned to the wall. There had been no confirmed activity by the Oakland County Child Killer for nearly twenty months prior to Busch's death.
The State Police have since released 3,400 pages of investigative records to Barry King.

Resumed investigation and new evidence

Investigation reports released to family of the victims
Police reports obtained by Barry King included new revelations, including DNA testing of new suspects and the bloodstained ligature and sketch from Busch's apartment. Catherine Broad, King's sister, compiled an archive of investigation material as the case grew.

Upon researching the case records, the King family produced a documentary entitled Decades of Deceit, which condemns the police and prosecutors for alleged shoddy investigations and uncooperative communication, and, in particular, of disregarding leads the family discovered in 2006. Funds generated from the sale of the documentary were donated to the Tim King fund, designated to help abused children and support activities for Birmingham children.

DNA tests of hair
Forensic DNA tests conducted in 2012 showed that hair found on the seat of Sloan's car and on the bodies of Stebbins and King were a match and came from the same unknown man. The hair DNA does not match Sloan, but implicates someone he knew or lent his car to.

Current developments/2012 case reopening
In 2013, an anonymous informant reported a blue AMC Gremlin buried in a farm field now being developed in Grand Blanc. Police are investigating the Gremlin for ties to the crime as King was last seen in a blue Gremlin.

"Jeff Gannon"
In 2005, an unidentified man, who would later emerge to become a common figure in the case and has been referred to by the alias of 
"Jeff", was reminded of a relationship he had in 1977 with an acquaintance. In an interview given to Oakland County investigators in 2010, Jeff informed them of atypical observations and actions while driving and conversing with the acquaintance, such as taking him to buildings where satanic rituals were allegedly performed. The acquaintance navigated through lesser-known routes associated with the case with ease. The acquaintance also spoke of details written in "Allen's" letter (see above). Jeff requested information about the "Allen" letter to help confirm his suspicions, but was denied.

In 2010, Jeff gave a recorded interview to Oakland County investigators and Prosecutor Jessica Cooper to present evidence pertaining to the investigation. Jeff claimed to have tried to approach Cooper with his findings and to convince her to place the case under the jurisdiction of the Department of Justice. The department was already involved through the FBI and through resources such as the ViCAP database. Cooper dismissed his suggestions and, as there was no new evidence presented, his request to inspect the "Allen" letter was denied. Cooper described the interview as "a rambling statement outlining a theory that the Oakland County Child Killer abductions and murders were related to pagan holidays, the lunar calendar, and Wiccan rituals".

Jeff proceeded to correspond with Deborah Jarvis, mother of victim Kristine Mihelich, and investigative journalists such as Bill Proctor and Heather Catallo in 2010. He claimed that he was among a team of a dozen investigators involved with the case and could identify the perpetrator of the crimes, but refused to indicate which law enforcement division he worked for. Jeff claimed to have invested 10,000 hours into the investigation over several years, but was reluctant to release his results as he doubted the competence of Wayne and Oakland County investigators. In a press release email, Jeff indicated possible meddling by Cooper and other reasons as to why he had not made his investigation public. According to Paul Hughes, an attorney representing Jarvis, Jeff's investigation discovered the murderer. However, according to Hughes, Jeff refused to identify the culprit unless the authorities divulged crucial information which Jeff requested during the initial interviews in 2010. Jeff wanted to positively confirm the identity of his suspect using the police evidence before proceeding further.

In 2012, Jeff presented his findings to a select group of Detroit journalists on Hughes' cell phone. To preserve his anonymity he insisted that his phone interview with Hughes not be recorded. He theorized that the killers were conducting Wiccan human sacrifice rituals coinciding with pagan celebrations or the lunar calendar. According to Jeff, there was a total of approximately 11–16 victims, significantly more than the four officially confirmed victims. He claimed his team found a number of similarities among the cases that were highly unlikely to be purely coincidental.

Based on this information, Hughes attempted a lawsuit against the Oakland County authorities for $100 million, citing mishandling of the investigation and demanding Cooper's resignation. The lawsuit alleged a cover-up conspiracy and obstruction. Hughes' website solicited donations, and offered a copy of Jeff's report for a donation of $1,500. The families of the victims, as well as Cooper, claimed that Hughes and Jeff were attempting to profit on their distress. The case was dismissed in March 2012 for lack of evidence.

Arch Sloan
In February 2019, the Investigation Discovery channel aired a two-part, four-hour documentary about the killings. At this same time, WXYZ-TV investigative reporter Heather Catallo announced that a key suspect, convicted child sex offender Arch Edward Sloan, had failed a polygraph test when he was interviewed by the Oakland County Child Killer Task Force in 2010 and 2012. Back in 2012 new DNA technology found that Sloan's car contained hair with the same mitochondrial profile as evidence found on the victims; however, it is not Sloan's.

See also 
 List of homicides in Michigan
List of fugitives from justice who disappeared
List of serial killers in the United States

References

Bibliography

External links
Detectives Revive Infamous Case (2005 Michigan State Police Press Release)
Don't Talk to Strangers (podcast series on the OCCK)

1976 murders in the United States
1977 murders in the United States
Child sexual abuse in the United States
Crimes in Michigan
Incidents of violence against boys
Incidents of violence against girls
March 1977 events in the United States
Murder in Michigan
Murderers of children
Oakland County, Michigan
Unidentified American rapists
Unidentified American serial killers
Unsolved murders in the United States
Violence against children